Wildebeest is a water coaster at Holiday World & Splashin' Safari in Santa Claus, Indiana, United States. It was designed and built beginning in 2009 by ProSlide Technology; it opened on May 7, 2010. Wildebeest is named after the African mammal, keeping with the water park's safari theme. In 2010, Wildebeest was voted the world's "Best New Waterpark Ride" at the Golden Ticket Awards, which are presented annually by Amusement Today magazine. Wildebeest was also awarded the Golden Ticket Award for "Best Waterpark Ride" in 2010, 2011, and 2022.

History

Development
On August 13, 2009, Holiday World & Splashin' Safari announced Wildebeest, a ProSlide HydroMagnetic Rocket that was to be built to the north of Bahari Wave Pool. Unique to Wildebeest was its use of a conveyor belt to transport riders uphill from ground level. This allowed riders unable to climb stairs to ride, unlike all other water coasters at the time. Another unique feature of Wildebeest was its length. During the construction of Wildebeest, producers from the National Geographic Channel's World's Toughest Fixes visited the park to document the progress.

Wildebeest opened on May 7, 2010. When the HydroMagnetic water coaster opened, it operated with fourteen 4-passenger boats. The riders in each boat are seated toboggan-style, rather than facing each other as on most traditional water slides.

Characteristics

Station
Wildebeest features two stations: a station for loading and a station for unloading. To enter the station, guests walk through the ride entrance and up the ramp. Guests then navigate a multitude of queue switchbacks. After passing through the switchbacks, guests approach the loading station. The loading station is split in half by the conveyor belt that eventually takes the boats up the lift hill. On the side of the station closest to the queues there is a grouping area, where riders from the main line and single riders line merge to ensure every seat is filled. The side of the loading station opposite the queues is the location of the ride operator's controls. At the end of the ride, boats enter the unloading station, at which point riders unload. The empty boats then pass over a series of rollers arranged in a curve that carry the boat back to the loading station.

Boats
Wildebeest uses 14 blue and orange 4-passenger boats. Riders are seated toboggan-style in each boat, with individual seat backs separating each rider. Each rider has two handles to hold on with, one on the left side of the boat and one on the right side of the boat. To allow the linear induction motors to interact with the boats and propel them uphill, a magnetic metal plate is attached to the underside of every boat.

Track
The track on Wildebeest is made out of numerous pieces of molded, red and yellow fiberglass supported by concrete pillars. The track features a conveyor belt lift hill as well as eight linear induction motors that propel the boats back uphill.

LIM technology
The technology on HydroMagnetic Rockets utilizes linear induction motors (LIMs) to propel boats uphill. An alternating magnetic field beneath the slide surface interacts with a steel plate mounted on the underside of each boat to push them uphill smoothly and quickly. Because the magnetic field under the slide surface needs power in order to be activated, boats will not be able to make it uphill in the case of a power outage. In that case, all of the boats throughout the course will roll back, causing each boat to valley at the bottom of a hill. LIM technology is commonly used on launched roller coasters.

Experience

The total ride experience on Wildebeest lasts approximately two minutes and thirty seconds.

Dispatch to First Tunnel
The ride begins with riders facing away from Bahari Wave Pool. After dispatch, the boat travels up a slight incline where it waits until there is adequate spacing between it and the boat in front of it. When the ride's system has determined there is adequate spacing between the boats, the boat moves forward and onto the conveyor belt lift hill. While on the lift hill, riders will pass under one of the ride's inclines and over two of its drops. At the top of the lift hill, the boat moves from the conveyor belt onto the fiberglass. At this point the boat makes a left turn before entering the ride's initial  drop at a 45° angle. During the descent, the boat passes under the lift hill before being rocketed back uphill by the first of eight linear induction motors. The boat crests the hill before making a small drop and being launched uphill for a second time. At the top of the hill the boat makes a right turn before traveling downhill and into the first of the two underground tunnels.

First Tunnel to End
At the bottom of the drop inside the tunnel, the boat passes under the ride's lift hill before it is immediately sent back uphill and out of the tunnel. At the crest of this hill the boat exits the tunnel and makes a small drop before traveling uphill thanks to the fourth LIM. The boat makes a right turn while slightly descending. At the conclusion of the turn, riders are sent back uphill again. At the top of the hill the boat makes a left turn before being sent uphill, where the boat passes over the lift hill. At the top of this hill the boat immediately drops back down and into the second underground tunnel. At the bottom of the drop, the boat is once again launched uphill and out of the tunnel. At the top of this hill the boat completes a left-turning helix before making a slight turn to the right to line up with the unloading station. Once the boat has made the turn to the right, it makes a small drop and is launched onto the end-of-the-ride conveyor belt with the help of a small LIM. The final conveyor belt brings the boat to the exit point, at which time riders unload.

Operation
Wildebeest operates with water and in heavily-wooded areas. Due to these factors, Wildebeest closes when there is lightning or high wind in Holiday World's immediate area.

In addition to weather conditions, some riders may be prohibited from boarding. Due to this restriction, some riders may be required to split up. All riders must abide by Splashin' Safari's dress code, which includes wearing modest swimwear or clothing, in order to ride. In addition, riders must leave all loose items in the station; riders who refuse to leave their loose items in the station will not be permitted to ride.

Each year, Holiday World & Splashin' Safari, in coordination with the Easter Seals Rehabilitation Center of Southwestern Indiana, publishes an accessibility guide for guests with disabilities. It is recommended, though not necessarily required, that all guests with the following conditions refrain from riding Wildebeest:
Back, Neck, or Bone Injury
Heart Trouble
High Blood Pressure
Pregnancy
Recent Surgery or Illness

Awards and records
In addition to other awards, Wildebeest was voted the world's "Best New Waterpark Ride" at the 2010 Golden Ticket Awards.

References

External links
Official website for Wildebeest at Holiday World & Splashin' Safari
Official YouTube video of Wildebeest posted by Holiday World & Splashin' Safari

Holiday World & Splashin' Safari
Amusement rides introduced in 2010
Water rides
Best New Ride winners